The Yakama Nation Tribal School is a public tribal high school located in Yakima County, Washington, adjacent to Toppenish, run by the Yakima Nation. It is affiliated with the Bureau of Indian Education (BIE).

It has a compact with the state of Washington and receives a grant from the BIE.

References

External links
 

High schools in Yakima County, Washington
Public high schools in Washington (state)
Native American high schools
Native Americans in Washington (state)
Yakama